William H. Strauss (1885–1943) was an American film actor active in the 1920s and 1930s. A character actor he appeared in a variety of supporting roles.

By 1928, Strauss had acted on stage and screen for more than 30 years.

Selected filmography

 The Barricade (1921)
 The Magic Cup (1921)
 Solomon in Society (1922)
 Other Women's Clothes (1922)
 The Law of the Snow Country (1926)
 The Roaring Road (1926)
 Private Izzy Murphy (1926)
 Millionaires (1926)
 Skinner's Dress Suit (1926)
 The Shamrock and the Rose (1927)
 Ladies at Ease (1927)
 Ragtime (1927)
 The Show Girl (1927)
 Ankles Preferred (1927)
 Sally in Our Alley (1927)
 For Ladies Only (1927)
 So This Is Love? (1928)
 The Rawhide Kid (1928)
 Smiling Irish Eyes (1929)
 Lucky Boy (1929)
 The Jazz Cinderella (1930)
 The Public Enemy (1931)
 Five Star Final (1931)
 Love in High Gear (1932)
 The Silk Express (1933)
 Hard to Handle (1933)
 Picture Snatcher (1933)
 Grand Slam (1933)
 Maizie (1933)
 The Mayor of Hell (1933)
 The House of Rothschild (1934)
 Beloved (1934)
 Broadway Bill (1934)
 One More Spring (1935)
 The Little Red Schoolhouse (1936)
 The Texas Rangers (1936)
 The Reckless Way (1936)
 Golden Boy (1939)

References

Bibliography
 Langman, Larry. American Film Cycles: The Silent Era. Greenwood Publishing, 1998.
 Munden, Kenneth White. The American Film Institute Catalog of Motion Pictures Produced in the United States, Part 1. University of California Press, 1997.

External links

1885 births
1943 deaths
American male film actors
People from New York City
American male stage actors